Muhammad Fikri Bin Sudin (born 14 February 1994) is a Malaysian professional footballer who plays for Perlis on loan from Perak in the Malaysia Premier League as a midfielder.

References

External links
 

1994 births
Living people
Malaysian footballers
People from Perak
Perak F.C. players
Perlis FA players
Negeri Sembilan FA players
Malaysia Super League players
Association football midfielders